Woodbridge was a county constituency centred on the town of Woodbridge in Suffolk.  It returned one Member of Parliament (MP) to the House of Commons of the Parliament of the United Kingdom.

History
The South-Eastern or Woodbridge Division was one of five single-member county divisions of the Parliamentary County of Suffolk created by the Redistribution of Seats Act 1885 to replace the existing two 2-member divisions for the 1885 general election. It was formed from parts of the Eastern Division of Suffolk. It was abolished under the Representation of the People Act 1948 for the 1950 general election when it was largely replaced by the new Sudbury and Woodbridge constituency.

Boundaries and boundary changes
1885–1918: The Municipal Borough of Woodbridge, the Sessional Divisions of Bosmere and Claydon, Samford, and Woodbridge, and the Corporate Town of Aldeburgh.

1918–1950: The Municipal Borough of Aldeburgh, the Urban Districts of Felixstowe and Woodbridge, the Rural Districts of Bosmere and Claydon, Samford, and Woodbridge, and part of the Rural District of Plomesgate.

Lost areas which had been annexed by the County Borough of Ipswich to the Parliamentary Borough thereof.

On abolition, southern parts, which comprised the majority of the seat, including Felixstowe and Woodbridge, formed part of the new county constituency of Sudbury and Woodbridge. Northern parts, including Aldeburgh, were transferred to Eye.

Members of Parliament

Elections

Elections in the 1880s

Elections in the 1890s

Elections in the 1900s

Elections in the 1910s 

General Election 1914–15:

Another General Election was required to take place before the end of 1915. The political parties had been making preparations for an election to take place and by the July 1914, the following candidates had been selected; 
Unionist: Robert Peel
Liberal: William Elliston

Elections in the 1920s

Elections in the 1930s 

General Election 1939–40:

Another General Election was required to take place before the end of 1940. The political parties had been making preparations for an election to take place and by the Autumn of 1939, the following candidates had been selected; 
Conservative: John Hare
Liberal: Douglas B Law
Labour: J M Stewart

Elections in the 1940s

Sources 

Parliamentary constituencies in Suffolk (historic)
Constituencies of the Parliament of the United Kingdom established in 1885
Constituencies of the Parliament of the United Kingdom disestablished in 1950
Woodbridge, Suffolk